Andimeshk (also Romanized as Āndīmeshḵ) is a city and capital of Andimeshk County, Khuzestan Province, Iran.

The name first appears in cuneiform tablets from Mesopotamia from the Ur III period (21st to 20th century BCE) in the form "Adamshakh", with a probable meaning "Crocodile (Town)". Later it was called "Andamaska" or "Andimaska", meaning "plenty of butter"; local villages like Gheel-AB and Lour and two fortresses were added to it. The city was en route to Ilam and Anshan and subsequently to Lorestan, which made it strategically important until the late Sassanid era.

History

During the Pahlavi dynasty era, Andimeshk received a great deal of modern development projects because of its location and resources. These included a railway, the Dokoohe military depot and an aluminum factory-silo, as well as many other industrial developments. The city had been connected along the Trans-Iranian Railway in 1929. During World War II a pipeline was also laid from Abadan, then the location of the world's largest refinery, to Andimeshk; from there the fuel was re-loaded onto trucks and transported to the Soviet Union. In 1955 the pipeline was extended from Andimeshk to Tehran.

Archaeology

North Khuzestan was home to some of the oldest civilizations in the world. The Choghamish hills have more than 8,000 years of treasures from different periods, and archaeologists have called on the city of dawn. Susa's Zanbil temple symbolizes the knowledge of the people who lived in this area over 3,000 years ago. Apadana palace is a symbol of the greatness of the Iranians. Shushtar waterfalls are a symbol of Iranian engineering and technology. Dezful's Old Bridge is a symbol of Persian authority. Cole Farah Izeh and Lure area in the west of Andimeshk County.

famous dams

Karkheh Dam 
The dam is not 127 m high rather 48 m and River Dez has the dam with 127m high and build by American multinational company. The Karkheh Dam damaged wild life down stream up to Shoush some 30 km south.[Please remove the false info down here!] The dam is on the Karkheh River in the north-western province of Khuzestan, the closest city being Andimeshk to the east. It is 127 metres high and has a reservoir capacity of 5.9 billion cubic meters. The Karkheh Dam is designed to irrigate 320,000 hectares of land, produce 520 MW of hydro-electricity and prevent downstream floods. In 1956, studies began on the Karkheh Dam by the American company Development and Resources Corporation, which was headed by David E. Lilienthal, the former Chairman of the TVA. In 1990, the final studies were completed by Mahab Ghods Consulting Engineers. The engineering division of the Islamic Revolutionary Guards Corps (IRGC) started construction on the Karkheh Dam in 1992 and the dam was complete in 2001. During construction, 120 contractual and over eight consultative companies worked on the dam. 5,000 workers constructed the dam and 40 died in the process.

Dez Dam 
Dez Dam is a famous dam for producing electricity for irrigation of agricultural lands, located on the Dez River, 23 km from Andimshek city in Khuzestan province of Iran. The construction of this dam started in 1959 and was built in 1963 by an Italian company. This dam has a height of 203 meters with a capacity of 3,340,000,000 cubic meters.

Geography

Andimeshk sits close to the foothills of the Zagros Mountains on the main north–south highway from Tehran to Ahvaz, the provincial capital of Khuzestan. The main rail line from Tehran to the Persian Gulf is 15 km (9 mi) from Andimeshk. The Persian Gulf is at least 200 km south.

Climate
Andimeshk has a hot semi-arid climate (Köppen climate classification BSh) with extremely hot summers and mild winters.

Notable persons
 Qadam Kheyr of Qalâvand, Luri woman warrior
 Saeid Abdevali, national wrestling athlete
 Habibollah Akhlaghi, national wrestling athlete

References

Populated places in Andimeshk County
Cities in Khuzestan Province